Tayma  (Taymanitic: ,) or Tema  Teman/Tyeman (Habakkuk 3:3) is a large oasis with a long history of settlement, located in northwestern Saudi Arabia at the point where the trade route between Medina and Dumah (al-Jawf) begins to cross the Nefud desert. It is located in the western part of Nefud desert.

History
The historical significance of Tayma is based on the existence there of an oasis, which helped it become a stopping point on commercial desert routes. An important event was the presence there of the Babylonian king Nabonidus, who took residence there in the mid-6th century BCE.

Bronze Age: Egyptian inscription
Recent archaeological discoveries show that Tayma has been inhabited since at least the Bronze Age. In 2010, the Saudi Commission for Tourism and Antiquities announced the discovery of a rock near Tayma bearing an inscription of Egyptian pharaoh Ramesses III. This was the first confirmed find of a hieroglyphic inscription on Saudi soil. Based on this discovery, researchers have hypothesized that Tayma was part of an important land route between the Red Sea coast of the Arabian Peninsula and the Nile Valley.

Assyrian, Babylonian, and biblical sources

The oldest mention of the oasis city appears as "Tiamat" in Assyrian inscriptions dating as far back as the 8th century BC. The oasis developed into a prosperous city, rich in water wells and handsome buildings. Tiglath-pileser III received tribute from Tayma, and Sennacherib (r. 705–681 BC) named one of Nineveh's gates as the Desert Gate, recording that "the gifts of the Sumu'anite and the Teymeite enter through it". It was rich and proud enough in the 7th century BC for Jeremiah to prophesy against it. It was ruled then by a local Arab dynasty, known as the Qedarites. The names of two 8th-century BC queens, Shamsi and Zabibei, are recorded.

The last Babylonian king, Nabonidus (ruled c. 556–539 BC), conquered Tayma and for ten years of his reign retired there to worship and search for prophecies, entrusting the kingship of Babylon to his son, Belshazzar. Taymanitic inscriptions also mention that people of Tayma fought wars with Dadān.

Cuneiform inscriptions possibly dating from the 6th century BC have been recovered from Tayma.

Tayma is mentioned several times in the Hebrew Bible. The biblical eponym is apparently Tema, one of the sons of Ishmael, after whom the region of Tema is named.

Jewish community: classical period and 12th century
According to Arab tradition, Tayma was inhabited by a Jewish community during the late classical period, though whether these were exiled Judeans or the Arab descendants of converts is unclear. During the 1st century AD, Tayma is believed to have been principally a Jewish settlement. The Jewish diaspora at the time of the Temple's destruction, according to Josephus, was in Parthia (Persia), Babylonia (Iraq), Arabia, as well as some Jews beyond the Euphrates and in Adiabene . In Josephus' own words, he had informed "the remotest Arabians" about the destruction. So, too, in pre-Islamic Arabic poetry, Tayma is often referred to as a fortified city belonging to the Jews, just as the anonymous Arab poet has described:

As late as the 6th century AD, Tayma was the home of the wealthy Jew, Samau’al ibn ‘Ādiyā.

Tayma and neighboring Khaybar were visited by Benjamin of Tudela some time around 1170 who claims that the city was governed by a Jewish prince. Benjamin was a Jew from Tudela in Spain. He travelled to Persia and Arabia in the 12th century.

Crusader threat
In the summer of 1181, Raynald of Châtillon, Crusader Lord of Oultrejordain, attacked a Muslim caravan near Tayma, despite a truce between Sultan Saladin and King Baldwin IV of Jerusalem, during a raid of the Red Sea area.

Climate
In Tayma, there is a desert climate. Most rain falls in the winter. The Köppen-Geiger climate classification is BWh. About  of precipitation falls annually.

Archaeology

The site was first investigated and mapped by Charles M. Doughty in 1877. 
The Tayma stele discovered by Charles Huber in 1883, now at the Louvre, lists the gods of Tayma in the 6th century BC: Ṣalm of Maḥram and Shingala and Ashira. This Ashira may be Athirat/Asherah.

Archeological investigation of the site, under the auspices of the German Archaeological Institute, is ongoing.

Clay tablets and stone inscriptions using Taymanitic script and language were found in ruins and around the oasis. Nearby Tayma was a Sabaean trading station, where Sabaean language inscriptions were found.

Economy
Historically, Tayma is known for growing dates. The oasis also has produced rock salt, which was distributed throughout Arabia. Tayma also mined alum, which was processed and used for the care of camels.

Points of interest
 Qasr Al-Ablaq (Arabic:قصر الأبلق) castle is located on the southwest side of the city. It was built by the Arabian Jewish poet and warrior Samuel ibn 'Adiya and his grandfather 'Adiya in the 6th century AD.
 The Qasr Al-Hamra (Arabic:قصر الحمراء) palace was built in the 7th century BC.
 Tayma has an archaeologically significant perimeter wall built around 3 sides of the old city in the 6th century BC.
 Qasr Al-Radhm (Arabic:قصر الرضم)
 Haddaj Well (Arabic:بئر هداج)
 Cemeteries 
 Many Aramaic, Lihyanite, Thamudic, Nabataean language inscriptions, around Tayma
 Qasr Al-Bejaidi(Arabic:قصر البجيدي)
 Al-Hadiqah Mound
 Al Naslaa rock formation
 Many museums. Although Tayma has museums of its own such as the "Tayma Museum of Archaeology and Ethnography", many artifacts from its history have been spread to other museums. Early finds such as the "Tayma Stele" are at the Louvre in Paris among others while large museums of national importance in Saudi Arabia, such as the National Museum of Saudi Arabia in Riyadh and the Jeddah Regional Museum of Archaeology and Ethnography also have significant collections of items from or related to ancient Tayma.

See also
Cities of the ancient Near East
Ibn Taymiyyah

References

Sources

External links
 Deutsches Archäologisches Institut: Tayma
 Nabatea: The 12 Tribes of Ishmael: Tema
 about Jouf district
 Verse account of Nabonidus, translation at Livius.org
 Chronicle of Nabonidus , translation at Livius.org
 Travel through the province of Tabuk, Splendid Arabia: A travel site with photos and routes

Populated places in Tabuk Province
Archaeological sites in Saudi Arabia
Oases of Saudi Arabia
Historic Jewish communities
Arabian Peninsula
History of the Arabian Peninsula
History of Saudi Arabia